Speaker Kerr may refer to:
James Kirkpatrick Kerr, late Speaker of the Senate of Canada
Michael C. Kerr (1827–1876), late Speaker of the United States House of Representatives